Constantine Tornikes or Tornikios was one of the most senior officials during the reign of the Byzantine emperor Alexios III Angelos (r. 1195–1203).

He was a descendant of the prominent Tornikios clan, of Armenian or Georgian origin. His father, Demetrios Tornikios, was a prominent official who rose to become logothetes tou dromou (Postal Logothete, in effect foreign minister), a post he continuously occupied from circa 1191 until his death.

Constantine is first mentioned as being involved in the riots that broke out in the imperial capital, Constantinople, in late 1198 or 1199. Originally, the mob protested against the crimes of the head of the capital's prison (the praetorium), John Lagos, but soon it turned into a full-scale rebellion against Alexios III, which had to be bloodily suppressed. At the time, Constantine was Eparch (governor) of the capital. In 1200 or 1201, after his father's death, Constantine succeeded him as logothetes tou dromou for a couple of years, before being replaced by Niketas Choniates.

Constantine's own son, also named Demetrios, became mesazon (chief minister) in the Empire of Nicaea, and his grandson Constantine was named to the high rank of sebastokrator.

References

Sources

12th-century births
13th-century deaths
12th-century Byzantine people
13th-century Byzantine people
Logothetai tou dromou
Constantine
Urban prefects of Constantinople